Blair Ingram Boyer (born 30 March 1981) is an Australian politician. He has been a Labor member of the South Australian House of Assembly since the 2018 state election, representing Wright.

A solicitor by training, Boyer worked as chief of staff for his predecessor Jennifer Rankine, and was also deputy chief of staff to Premier Jay Weatherill.

In May 2018, Boyer was appointed the Shadow Minister for Education, Training and Skills in the Malinauskas shadow ministry. After his party won government in the March 2022 state election, he was appointed as Minister for Education, Training and Skills in the Malinauskas ministry.

References

1981 births
Living people
Members of the South Australian House of Assembly
Australian Labor Party members of the Parliament of South Australia
Monash University alumni
21st-century Australian politicians